Sports tourism refers to travel which involves either observing or participating in a sporting event while staying apart from the tourists' usual environment.  Sport tourism is a fast-growing sector of the global travel industry and equates to $7.68 billion.

Classification of sport tourism
There are several classifications of sport tourism. Gammon and Robinson suggested that sports tourism can be categorized as Hard Sports Tourism or Soft Sports Tourism, while Gibson suggested that there are three types of sports tourism: Sports Event Tourism, Celebrity and Nostalgia Sport Tourism and Active Sport Tourism.

Hard and soft sport tourism
The "hard" definition of sport tourism refers to the quantity of people participating at a competitive sport events. Normally these kinds of events are the motivation that attract visitors to the events. Olympic Games, FIFA World Cup, F1 Grand Prix and regional events such as NASCAR Sprint Cup Series could be described as hard sports tourism.

The "soft" definition of sport tourism is when the tourist travels to participate in recreational sporting, or signing up for leisure interests. Hiking, skiing, running and canoeing can be described as soft sports tourism. Perhaps the most common form of soft sports tourism involves golf in regards to destinations in Europe and the United States. A large number of people are interested in playing some of the world's greatest and highest ranked courses, and take great pride in checking those destinations off of their list of places to visit.

Sporting event tourism
Sports event tourism refers to the visitors who visit a city to watch events. The two events that attract the most tourists worldwide are the Olympics and the FIFA World Cup. These events held once every four years, in a different city in the world. Sport tourism in the United States is more focused on events that happen annually. The major event for the National Football League is the Super Bowl, held at the end of the year in different city every year. Even though the National Hockey League started the annual NHL Winter Classic game in 2008, the 2014 New Year's outdoor hockey game rivaled the Stanley Cup Tournament in popularity and "revitalized the NHL". As of 2015, the newest trend in college basketball was to start the season off with annual tournaments such as the Maui Invitational held in Hawaii, and the Battle for Atlantis which is played in the Bahamas. This idea of pairing quality sports events with the Bahamas attractions raised the island's profile and brought in more visitors and dollars to the country. The Battle for Atlantis brought more than 5,000 fans in during Thanksgiving week for the three-day tournament. The event helped to increase hotel capacity from what is typically around 60 percent this time of year to 90 percent.  Sport tourism "is a growing market and many different cities and countries want to be involved,”

Celebrity and nostalgia sport tourism
Celebrity and nostalgia sport tourism involves visits to the sports halls of fame and venue and meeting sports personalities in a vacation basis.

Active sport tourism
Active sport tourism refers to those who participate in the sports or sport events. Rugby football, football, basketball, etc are considered active sports and many sport events (which we call tournaments or festivals) are organized each year in most of the countries in the world.

See also

 Spectator sport
 List of adjectival tourisms

References

External links

Tourism
Types of tourism